Linda Joy Holtzman is an American rabbi and author. In 1979 she became one of the first women in the United States to serve as the presiding rabbi of a synagogue, when she was hired by Beth Israel Congregation of Chester County, which was then located in Coatesville, Pennsylvania.

Biography
She had graduated in 1979 from the Reconstructionist Rabbinical College in Philadelphia, yet was hired by Beth Israel despite their being a Conservative congregation. Holtzman was thus the first woman to serve as a rabbi for a solely Conservative congregation, as the Conservative movement did not then ordain women. However, Sandy Eisenberg Sasso served as rabbi along with her husband at the congregation Beth-El Zedeck in Indianapolis from 1977 until 2013; Beth El Zedeck is identified with both the Reconstructionist and Conservative movements. In 1979 The New York Times published the article "Only Female Presiding Rabbi in U.S. Begins Her Work in a Small Town", in which the author described Holtzman's hiring as "a marked breakthrough for the growing numbers of women who have faced obstacles in becoming a rabbi-in-charge", and quoted Holtzman as saying "the fact that I have an appointment in a small town and that they have entrusted me with functions they believe are important is very significant for women and for the Jewish community". In 1981 Holtzman became the first female rabbi to give a keynote speech for the World Congress of Gay and Lesbian Jews.

While Holtzman believed in the tenets of the Reconstructionist movement, she said that members of the congregation could choose to follow either traditional or nontraditional ideas. Holtzman served at Beth Israel until 1985, when her contract was up for renegotiation. She had been living in Philadelphia and commuting to Coatesville for several years; although she and her lesbian partner had had an open commitment ceremony in Philadelphia, she had not yet come out to her congregation (but despite living something of a double life, she had enjoyed her time with the synagogue and found it very rewarding.) Now she informed Beth Israel's board of directors that she and her partner were planning to have children and that she wanted co-parenting leave, and by her subsequent account, each board member privately indicated they were okay with this but that the other board members were not ready for such a development. She left the synagogue and later that year became spiritual leader of Beth Ahavah, an LGBT congregation in Center City, Philadelphia.

She is the author of the article "Struggle, Change and Celebration: My Life as a Lesbian Rabbi" in the book Lesbian Rabbis: The First Generation, edited by Rebecca Alpert, Sue Levi Elwell, and Shirley Idelson (Rutgers University Press, 2000). She also wrote a chapter in Twice Blessed (Beacon Press, 1989) titled "Jewish Lesbian Parenting."

She is now the Adjunct Associate Professor of Practical Rabbinics at the Reconstructionist Rabbinical College and the rabbi of the Tikkun Olam Chavurah in Philadelphia. She is also the leader of her local Reconstructionist chevra kadisha. She is married to Betsy Conston, with whom she has raised two sons, Jordan and Zachary Holtzman-Conston.

See also
Timeline of women rabbis

References

External links 

 Congregation Beth Ahavah records at John J. Wilcox, Jr. LGBT Archives, William Way LGBT Community Center

Year of birth missing (living people)
American Reconstructionist rabbis
Conservative women rabbis
American lesbian writers
LGBT rabbis
Living people
21st-century American Jews
21st-century American women writers